Thomas Fletcher Tedder, Ph.D., (born May 14, 1956) is an American immunologist. He is best known for his work in the fields of B lymphocyte biology and regulation. He is currently the Alter E. Geller Professor for Research in Immunology at Duke University.

Career
Tedder received his Ph.D. in molecular cell biology from the University of Alabama in 1984 and completed his postdoctoral training as a research fellow in pathology at Harvard Medical School. He was a faculty member at Dana–Farber Cancer Institute and Harvard Medical School from 1985 to 1998 before joining Duke University in 1993 as its founding chairman of immunology. Tedder studies the structure and function of B lymphocyte cell surface molecules that regulate B cell function, activation, and signal transduction. He currently has 401 total publications and 25 issued patents relating to B cells and their products, including CD19, CD20, CD22, CD83, and L-selectin. He has founded four biotherapeutic companies, including Angelica Therapeutics, Cellective Therapeutics, Cellective BioTherapy and most recently, Antigenomycs, Inc.

The drug Tedder developed at Cellective Therapeutics, inebilizumab, has now been approved for NMSOD use in the United States under the clinical name Uplizna.

References

Duke University faculty
University of Alabama alumni
American immunologists
1956 births

Living people